A special election was held in  on August 4, 1814 to fill a vacancy left by the resignation of Daniel Dewey (F) on February 24, 1814, having been appointed justice of the Supreme Judicial Court of Massachusetts

Electoral results

Hulbert took his seat September 26, 1814

See also
List of special elections to the United States House of Representatives

References

Massachusetts 1814 12
1814 12
Massachusetts 1814 12
Massachusetts 12
United States House of Representatives 12
United States House of Representatives 1814 12